Chay Wai Chuen (born 5 March 1950) is a Singaporean diplomat and former politician. A former member of the governing People's Action Party (PAP), he was the Member of Parliament (MP) representing the Queenstown ward of Brickworks GRC between 1988 and 1997 and later Tanjong Pagar GRC between 1997 and 2006.

Early life and education
Born on 5 March 1950, Chay attended St Joseph's Institution before graduating from the University of Singapore (now the National University of Singapore) with a Bachelor of Social Sciences with honours degree in economics and statistics in 1973 and a Master of Social Sciences degree in 1978. 

He was also a Research Scholar in Economics at the University of Singapore between 1973 and 1974 and Council Member at the National University of Singapore between 2000 and 2004.

He also completed a Master of Arts degree in development economics at the University of Sussex in 1975 under the Commonwealth Scholarship.

He graduated from the Singapore Command and Staff College in 1988 and attended the six-week Advanced Management Program at Harvard Business School.

Career
Chay served as the chief financial officer and director of supply chain of NTUC Fairprice Co-operative Ltd, a food retailing chain, where he worked from 1996 to 2007. He was also the chief executive officer of its subsidiary, Grocery Logistics of Singapore Pte Ltd.

Political career
Chay served as a Member of Parliament between 1988 and 2006 and was a member of the Public Accounts Committee between 1993 and 2006. 

During this period, he served as Chairman of the Government Parliamentary Committee for Communications and IT between 1997 and 2001 and Chairman of the Government Parliamentary Committee for Transport between 2002 and 2004. 

He was also Chairman of the Brickworks Town Council between 1991 and 1997 and later Tanjong Pagar Town Council between 2001 and 2004. 

He announced his retirement from politics on 11 April 2006.

Personal life
Chay is married to Agnes Tseng and they have two children.

References

1950 births
People's Action Party politicians
Members of the Parliament of Singapore
Living people
National University of Singapore alumni
Saint Joseph's Institution, Singapore alumni
Singaporean diplomats
High Commissioners of Singapore to Sri Lanka
Singaporean people of Chinese descent